

si

sia-sil
siagoside (INN)
Sibelium
sibenadet (USAN)
Siblin
sibopirdine (INN)
sibrafiban (INN)
sibrotuzumab (INN)
sibutramine (INN)
siccanin (INN)
sifalimumab (USAN, INN)
sifaprazine (INN)
sifilcon A (USAN)
siguazodan (INN)
Silafed
Silain
silandrone (INN)
Sildaflo 
Sildec
sildenafil (INN)
Silexin
silibinin (INN)
silicristin (INN)
silidianin (INN)
silmitasertib (INN)
silperisone (INN)
Silphen 
siltenzepine (INN)
silteplase (INN)
Siltussin-CF
siltuximab (USAN)
Silvadene

sim-sit
simaldrate (INN)
simenepag (USAN, INN)
simendan (INN)
simeprevir (INN)
simetride (INN)
simfibrate (INN)
simoctocog alfa (INN)
simotaxel (USAN)
Simponi
simtrazene (INN)
Simulect
simvastatin (INN)
sinapultide (INN)
sincalide (INN)
Sine-Aid IB 
sinecatechins (USAN)
sinefungin (INN)
Sinemet 
Sinequan 
Singulair 
sinitrodil (INN)
Sinografin 
sintropium bromide (INN)
sipatrigine (INN)
siplizumab (INN)
sipoglitazar (USAN)
siponimod (INN)
sipuleucel-T (USAN)
siratiazem (INN)
sirolimus (INN)
sirukumab (INN)
sisomicin (INN)
sitafloxacin (INN)
sitagliptin (USAN)
sitalidone (INN)
sitimagene ceradenovec (USAN)
sitofibrate (INN)
sitogluside (INN)

siv-siz
sivelestat (INN)
sivifene (USAN, INN)
sizofiran (INN)